"The Ultimate Party Collection Vol. 1" is the first album released by Sick Animation's Marc M. It was released on September 24, 2007.

Track listing

References

Hip hop albums by American artists
2007 albums